The Mongolian Embassy in Washington, D.C. is the diplomatic mission of Mongolia to the United States. It is located at 2833 M Street Northwest, Washington, D.C. in the Georgetown neighborhood.

Mongolia and the United States established diplomatic relations in 1987, and the embassy was opened in 1989.

The head of the Mongolian Embassy in Washington, D.C. is Ambassador Khasbazaryn Bekhbat.

In addition to the embassy in Washington, D.C., Mongolia maintains consulates in Chicago and San Francisco.

References

External links
 Mongolian Embassy in Washington

Washington, D.C.
Mongolia
Georgetown (Washington, D.C.)
Mongolia–United States relations